The German National Time Trial Championships have been held since 1994.

Men

U23

Women

See also
German National Road Race Championships
National road cycling championships

References

National road cycling championships
Cycle races in Germany
Recurring sporting events established in 1994
1994 establishments in Germany
Time Trial